Dickens Peak is a peak  north-northwest of Smith Peak in the Walker Mountains of north-central Thurston Island. It was named by the Advisory Committee on Antarctic Names after Aviation Machinist's Mate J.D. Dickens, an aircrewman in the Eastern Group of U.S. Navy Operation Highjump, which obtained aerial photographs of this peak and adjacent coastal areas, 1946–47.

See also
 Mountains in Antarctica

Maps
 Thurston Island – Jones Mountains. 1:500000 Antarctica Sketch Map. US Geological Survey, 1967.
 Antarctic Digital Database (ADD). Scale 1:250000 topographic map of Antarctica. Scientific Committee on Antarctic Research (SCAR), 1993–2016.

References 

Mountains of Ellsworth Land